Ikinu is a small town in Kenya's Central Province. Ikinu has a shopping centre and a primary school under the name Ikinu Primary school.

Due to government boundary changes, where counties were introduced and Provinces deemed useless, The town is now in a county known as Kiambu County.

References 

Culture. 
The residents are members of the kikuyu community. Though most of kikuyu customs are slowly being forgotten, the residents follow them during marriage negotiations, boys circumcision and a few other ceremonies. 
Christian teachings are the ones currently guiding most activities.

Populated places in Central Province (Kenya)